The Qu'appelle River Dam is the smaller of two embankment dams: which created Lake Diefenbaker in Saskatchewan, Canada. The larger dam is Gardiner Dam, the biggest embankment dam in Canada and one of the biggest in the world. Construction of both dams began in the 1959 and was completed in 1967. The dam keeps the flow of water in the Qu'Appelle River relatively constant, as the Qu'Appelle River formerly dried up in many places every summer at the conclusion of the spring freshet from the Rocky Mountains, which feeds the South Saskatchewan River. This along with Buffalo Pound Dam at Buffalo Pound Lake, which supplies water to Regina, Moose Jaw and the Mosaic  potash mine at Belle Plaine, keeps the lake from fluctuating excessively.
The Canadian Pacific Railway crosses the river via the top of the dam, and the dam was designed with this type of loading in mind. The dam is 3100 metres long and 27 metres high.
Douglas Provincial Park (named after former premier of Saskatchewan Tommy Douglas) extends from the dam to Mistusinne.

Highway 19 crosses the Qu'Appelle Valley about 1 km southeast of the dam, and provides access to a vantage point of the dam Lake Diefenbaker and the Qu'Appelle Valley.

During the time of glaciation on North America, the retreating glacier would block the flow north and would force the water flow down the Qu'Appelle River. When the glaciers retreated further, water would then flow north. Before the Gardiner Dam was built, spring flows were high enough to allow water down the Qu'Appelle but would dry up later in the fall. Now as the Qu'Appelle Dam always retains the water of Lake Diefenbaker, water is released into the Qu'Appelle River in order to maintain flows throughout the entire year. This serves the farmers along the Qu'Appelle who use it for irrigation and watering their livestock.

See also 
 Saskatchewan Water Security Agency
 List of dams and reservoirs in Canada
 List of lakes of Saskatchewan
 Gardiner Dam
 Craven Dam
 Katepwa Dam

References

External links
 Douglas Provincial Park

Dams in Saskatchewan
Maple Bush No. 224, Saskatchewan
Dams completed in 1967
1967 establishments in Saskatchewan